This is a list of watch manufacturers based in Germany. Note that manufacturers that are named after the founder are sorted by surname

Entries with an article should also be suitable for inclusion in :Category:Watch manufacturing companies of Germany. Entries which do not yet have an article may be removed if not justified for inclusion with a reliable, independent source and inline citation.

A 
 Archimede
 Aristo-Vollmer GmbH
 Askania

B 
 Jochen Benzinger
 Bethge & Söhne
 Botta Design
 Rainer Brand
Martin Braun

D 
 Damasko
 Dekla
 Dievas
 D. Dornblüth & Sohn
 Dugena

G 
 Glashütte Original
 Grieb & Benzinger
 Moritz Grossmann
 Guinand

H 
 Haller Uhrenfabrik GmbH
 Hanhart
 Hentschel Hamburg

J 
 Junghans
 Junkers

K 
 Kienzle Uhren
 Kudoke

L 
 Laco
 Lang & Heyne
 A. Lange & Söhne
 Lehmann
 Lilienthal
 Limes

M 
 Daniel Malchert
 MeisterSinger
 Montblanc
 Mühle Glashütte

N 
 Rainer Nienaber
 Thomas Ninchritz
 NOMOS Glashütte

S 
 Schäuble & Söhne
 Jörg Schauer
 Schaumburg
 Alexander Shorokhoff
 Sinn
 Bruno Söhnle
 Steinhart
Stowa

T 
 Temption
 Tourby
 Tutima

U 
 Uhrenwerk Weimar
 Union Glashütte
UTS München

W 
 Wempe

Z 
 Zeppelin

See also 
 Glashütte
 List of watch manufacturers

References 

Manufacturers, German
Watch, German
Watch manufacturers